Roger David Covell AM FAHA (1 February 1931 – 4 June 2019) was an Australian musicologist, critic and author.  He was Professor Emeritus in the School of the Arts and Media at the University of New South Wales, in Sydney, and continued until shortly before his death to contribute articles and reviews to The Sydney Morning Herald, where he served as principal music critic from 1960 until the late 1990s.

Biography
Published in 1967, Covell's monograph Australia's Music: Themes of a New Society was the first comprehensive study of the history, development and performance of Western serious (classical) music in Australia, and is now regarded as a seminal text in Australian musicology.  It has been widely referenced among succeeding generations of Australian composers, practitioners and critics of serious music, and by Australian cultural historians generally.

Covell died in Sydney on 4 June 2019.

Bibliography

Non-fiction
Australia's Music: Themes of a New Society (Sun Books, Melbourne, 1967)

Libretti
Morning-song for the Christ Child: for unaccompanied mixed chorus, with music by Peter Sculthorpe (Faber Music, c1966) 
Sea chant: for unison voices and orchestra, with music by Peter Sculthorpe (Faber Music, c1968)
Autumn Song: for unaccompanied mixed chorus, with music by Peter Sculthorpe (Faber Music, c1972)

Edited
The Currency Lass, or, My Native Girl (a musical play in two acts) by Edward Geoghegan (Currency Press, c1976)

Awards and nominations
On Australia Day 1986, Covell was appointed a Member of the Order of Australia in recognition of service to music.  Seven years later he was awarded the Pascall Prize for Critical Writing, in recognition of his services to music criticism in Australia.

APRA Awards
The APRA Awards are held in Australia and New Zealand by the Australasian Performing Right Association to recognise songwriting skills, sales and airplay performance by its members annually.

! 
|-
| 2006 || Roger Covell || Long-Term Contribution to the Advancement of Australian Music||  ||
|-

Bernard Heinze Memorial Award
The Sir Bernard Heinze Memorial Award is given to a person who has made an outstanding contribution to music in Australia.

! 
|-
| 2012 || Roger Covell || Sir Bernard Heinze Memorial Award ||  ||  
|-

References

1931 births
2019 deaths
APRA Award winners
Australian male dramatists and playwrights
Australian music critics
Australian music journalists
Australian musical theatre librettists
Classical music critics
Members of the Order of Australia
Recipients of the Centenary Medal
Academic staff of the University of New South Wales
20th-century Australian dramatists and playwrights